The Lands Tribunal for Scotland is a tribunal with jurisdiction over land and property in Scotland, relating to title obligations, compulsory purchase and other private rights. The Tribunal was established under the Lands Tribunal Act 1949, which also created the separate Lands Tribunal in England and Wales and Northern Ireland.

Although the statutory basis of the Lands Tribunal for Scotland was the Lands Tribunal Act 1949, the Tribunal itself was not actually created until 1971, as there was not considered a sufficient amount of work to be undertaken. The Conveyancing and Feudal Reform (Scotland) Act 1970 gave the Lands Tribunal new powers to discharge title conditions, which prompted its actual establishment in March 1971.

The Tribunal is based in George House, on George Street in Edinburgh.

History 
The Tribunal was established under the Lands Tribunal Act 1949, which also created the separate Lands Tribunal in England and Wales and Northern Ireland.

Although the statutory basis of the Lands Tribunal for Scotland was the Lands Tribunal Act 1949, the Tribunal itself was not actually created until 1971, as there was not considered a sufficient amount of work to be undertaken. The Conveyancing and Feudal Reform (Scotland) Act 1970 gave the Lands Tribunal new powers to discharge title conditions, which prompted its actual establishment in March 1971.

Remit and jurisdiction
The jurisdiction of the Lands Tribunal is over land and property in Scotland, relating to title obligations, Right to Buy, compulsory purchase and other private rights.

The Lands Tribunal for Scotland specifies that the main areas of work are:

the discharge or variation of title conditions
tenants’ rights to purchase their public sector houses
disputed compensation for compulsory purchase of land or loss in value of land caused by public works
valuations for rating on non-domestic premises
appeals against the Keeper of the Registers of Scotland
appeals about valuation of land on pre-emptive purchase
voluntary or joint references in which the Tribunal acts as arbiter.

Judges and office holders
The Tribunal is currently composed of a President and two other members. The number of posts are determined by the Scottish Ministers and members are appointed by the Lord President of the Court of Session under Section 2 of the Lands Tribunal Act 1949. The Lord President must consult the Scottish Branch of the Royal Institution of Chartered Surveyors before appointing anyone other than the President. The President of the Lands Tribunal must be legally qualified having previously served in judicial office, or be an Advocate or solicitor.

The first President of the Tribunal, Walter Elliott, was appointed Chairman of the Scottish Land Court in 1978, and since then both offices have been held together, although the courts remain separate. The President of the Lands Tribunal is not accorded membership of the College of Justice (and subsequently the judicial title, Lord) by virtue of this position but through Chairmanship of the Land Court. The Tribunal should also contain members legally qualified with experience as an advocate or solicitor, and those experienced in the valuation of land, who are to be appointed by the Lord President after consulting the Scottish Chairman of the Royal Institution of Chartered Surveyors. The current President is Lord Duthie who was appointed on 9 January 2023.

 the members of the Tribunal were:
Lord Duthie (President)
Ralph A Smith QC
Andrew Oswald FRICS

Presidents of the Lands Tribunal
1971 - 1992: Archie Elliott, Lord Elliott
1993 - 1996: Alexander Philip, Lord Philip
1996 – 2014: James McGhie, Lord McGhie
2014 – 2022: Roderick John MacLeod, Lord Minginish
2023 – present: Lord Duthie

See also 
 Lands Tribunal
 Lands Tribunal for Northern Ireland
 Scottish Land Court

References

External links 
 

Courts and tribunals established in 1971
1971 establishments in Scotland
Scottish coast and countryside
Agriculture in Scotland
Tribunals of the Scottish Government
Land use
Scots property law
Organisations based in Edinburgh
Feudalism in Scotland
Land reform in Scotland